William J. Nellis (born June 25, 1941) is an American physicist. He is an Associate of the Physics Department of Harvard University. His work has focused on ultra-condensed matter at extreme pressures, densities and temperatures achieved by fast dynamic compression. He is most well-known for the first experimental observation of a metallic phase of dense hydrogen, a material predicted to exist by Eugene Wigner and Hillard Bell Huntington in 1935.

Nellis has been President of the International Association for the Advancement of High Pressure Science and Technology (AIRAPT) and Chairman of the American Physical Society (APS) Topical Group on Shock Compression of Condensed Matter. He has received the Bridgman Award of AIRAPT, the Duvall Award of APS and is a Fellow of the APS Division of Condensed Matter Physics.

Nellis is an author or coauthor of more than 250 published papers. Most of his research has been focused on materials during or after dynamic compression at high pressures for properties including electrical conductivities, temperatures, equation-of-state data, and shock-wave profiles to investigate compressibilities and phase transitions in liquids and solids.

Early life and education 
Nellis was born in Chicago, Illinois in 1941. He received his B.S. degree in Physics from Loyola University of Chicago, College of Liberal Arts and Sciences, in 1963 and his Ph.D. degree in Physics from Iowa State University in 1968. His Ph.D. thesis research included measurements of electrical and thermal conductivities of single crystals of the Rare Earth elements Gadolinium, Terbium and Holmium in the Ames National Laboratory at Iowa State.

Following graduate school, Nellis was a postdoctoral researcher in the Materials Science Division of Argonne National Laboratory (ANL), where he measured electrical and magnetic properties of ordered and disordered alloys of the Actinide elements Plutonium, Neptunium and Uranium mixed with non-magnetic Transition Metals. The experiments at ISU and ANL were performed at cryogenic temperatures in the range of 2 – 300 Kelvin.

Career and work 
From 1970 to 1973, Nellis was Assistant Professor of Physics at Monmouth College (ILL) where he taught undergraduate physics courses and was Director of the College’s Computer Center. In 1973, he left Monmouth to join Lawrence Livermore National Laboratory (LNLL), where he performed computational simulations of condensed matter under dynamic compression driven by shock waves generated with high explosives.

In 1976, Nellis moved within LLNL to the High-Dynamic-Pressure Experimental Group, in which he measured properties of approximately 30 cryogenic liquids and solids compressed dynamically to pressures in the range 20-500 GPa with associated temperatures up to as much as several 1000 Kelvins. Those molecular fluids are representative of fluids in the interiors of Giant Planets and in reacted high explosives. Those temperatures, pressures and densities were generated by impact of a high-velocity projectile onto a target material. Impactors were accelerated with a two-stage light-gas gun to velocities as large as 8 km/s (18,000 mph). Impactors were typically 25 mm in diameter and 2–3 mm thick. Samples were 25 mm in diameter and 0.5 – 3 mm thick. Experimental lifetimes were around 100 nanoseconds. Fast electrical and optical measurements were made with detectors having sub-ns resolution time.

In 2003, Nellis retired from LNLL and joined the Department of Physics at Harvard University as an Associate. Since leaving LLNL, Nellis has collaborated with scientists in Japan, Russia, China and Sweden, as well as in the United States.

Nellis has also been involved with the International Association for the Advancement of High Pressure Science and Technology, AIRAPT, for the greater part of his career serving as the vice president from 1999 to 2003 and as the president from 2003 to 2007. From 1998 to 2007, he served as the editor of the journal Shock Waves.

Significant discoveries 
Nellis is most well-known for the first experimental observation of a metallic phase of dense hydrogen, a material predicted to exist by Wigner and Huntington in 1935. Dynamic compression generates temperature T and entropy S on rapid compression and the product TS controls phase stability via the free energy. By tuning the magnitude and temporal shape of a reverberating shock pressure pulse, H2 dissociates to H at sufficiently large density that measured electrical conductivities of fluid H cross over from semiconducting to degenerate metal with Mott’s Minimum Metallic Conductivity at pressure 1.4 million bars (140 GPa), nine-fold H atom density in liquid H2 and calculated temperature of 3000 K. Similar electrical conductivities of H under multiple-shock compression have been measured by Fortov et al. Celliers et al at the NIF pulsed laser have measured optical reflectivity of dense fluid metallic D of ~0.3 under multiple-shock compression, which value agrees with the inception of metallization of D calculated by Rillo et al. Measured electrical conductivities of fluid SiH4 up to 106 GPa under multiple-shock compression with a two-stage light-gas gun are in good agreement with the electrical conductivity data measured in.

Once the pressure dependence of the electrical conductivity of semiconducting and metallic fluid H was measured, those conductivities were used to address the likely cause of the unusual external magnetic fields of the planets Uranus and Neptune, which are neither dipolar nor axisymmetric as the fields of Earth and other planets with magnetic fields. Planetary fields are caused by convection of electrically conducting fluids in their interiors, most of which in Uranus and Neptune is hydrogen.  Because the electrical conductivity of fluid H approaches metallic at ~100 GPa, the magnetic fields of Uranus and Neptune are primarily generated close to their outer surfaces, which implies the existence of nondipolar contributions to their fields, as observed.  Because Uranus and Neptune are fluids, no strong rotating rock layers exist in their interiors to couple the existence of planetary rotational motion into the convective currents that generate the magnetic fields of Uranus and Neptune. His experiments on liquids expected at high pressures and temperatures in deep planetary interiors have major implications for developing pictures of the interiors of giant planets both in this and in other solar systems. 
 
Through his research, Nellis also discovered that at very high dynamic shock pressures and temperatures, electrons in metals and strong insulators have a common uniform behavior in shock velocity space, which is analogous to Asymptotic Freedom in sub-nuclear High-Energy Physics. The mechanism in insulators is a crossover from strong localized directional electronic bonds to a more-compressible delocalized electronic band structure characteristic of metals.

His technique to recover solids as thin as a micron intact from shock pressures up to a million bars has facilitated synthesis of metastable materials for characterization of material structures and physical properties.

Awards and honors 
1987 - Fellow of the American Physical Society Division of Condensed Matter Physics 
1998 - Duvall Award of American Physical Society Topical Group on Shock Compression
2000 - Teller Fellow, Lawrence Livermore National Laboratory
2001 - Bridgman Award of the International Association for the Advancement of High Pressure Science and Technology

Selected articles 
W. J. Nellis (2017). Ultracondensed Matter by Dynamic Compression. Cambridge University Press.
Nellis, W. J., Mitchell, A. C., van Thiel, M., Devine, G. J., Trainor, R. J. and Brown, N. (1983) Equation-of-state data for molecular hydrogen and deuterium at shock pressures in the range 2-76 GPa (20-760 kbar), Journal of Chemical Physics, 79, 1480-1486.
Nellis, W. J., Maple, M. B. and Geballe, T. H. (1988). Synthesis of metastable superconductors by high dynamic pressure. In SPIE Vol. 878 Multifunctional Materials, ed. R. L. Bellingham: Society of Photo-Optical Instrumentation Engineers, pp. 2–9.
Nellis, W. J., Weir, S. T. and Mitchell, A. C. (1996) Metallization and electrical conductivity of hydrogen in Jupiter, Science, 273, 936-938.
Chau, R., Mitchell, A. C., Minich, R. W. and Nellis, W. J. (2003). Metallization of fluid nitrogen and the Mott transition in highly compressed low-Z fluids, Physical Review Letters, 90, 245501-1-245501-4.
Zhou, X., Nellis, W. J., Li, Jiabo, Li Jun, Zhao, W., et al (2015). Optical emission, shock-induced opacity, temperatures, and melting of Gd3Ga5O12 single crystals shock-compressed from 41 to 290 GPa, Journal of Applied Physics, 118, 055903-1 -055903-9.
Weir, S. T., Mitchell, A. C. and Nellis, W. J. (1996). Metallization of fluid molecular hydrogen at 140 GPa (1.4 Mbar). Physical Review Letters, 76, 1860-1863. 
Nellis, W. J., Weir, S. T. and Mitchell, A. C. (1999). Minimum metallic conductivity of fluid hydrogen at 140 GPa (1.4 Mbar). Physical Review B, 59, 3434-3449.
Nellis, W. J., Louis, A. A. and Ashcroft, N. W. (1998). Metallization of fluid hydrogen. Philosophical Transactions of the Royal Society, 356, 119-138.
Nellis, W. J. (2000). Making metallic hydrogen. Scientific American, 282, 84-90.
Nellis, W. J. (2019). Dense quantum hydrogen. Low Temperature Physics/Fizika Nizhikh Temperatur, 45, 338-341.
Arko, A. J., Brodsky, M. B. and Nellis, W. J. (1972). Spin fluctuations in Plutonium and other Actinide metals and compounds, Physical Review B, 5, 4564-4569.
Hubbard, W. B., Nellis, W. J., Mitchell, A. C., Holmes, N. C., Limaye, S. S. and McCandless, P. C., (1991). Interior structure of Neptune: Comparison with Uranus, Science, 253, 648-651.
Trunin, R. F., ed. (2001). Experimental Data on Shock Compression and Adiabatic Expansion of Condensed Matter. Sarov: Russian Federal Nuclear Center VNIIEF.
Kanel, G. I., Nellis, W. J., Savinykh, A. S., Razorenov, S. V. and Rajendran, A. M. (2009). Response of seven crystallographic orientations of sapphire crystals to shock stresses of 16-86 GPa, Journal of Applied Physics, 106, 043524-1-043524-10.
Liu, H., Tse, J. S. and Nellis, W. J. (2015). The electrical conductivity of Al2O3 under shock compression. Scientific Reports, 5, 12823-1-12823-9.

References 

1941 births
Living people
Writers from Chicago
Loyola University Chicago alumni
Iowa State University alumni
Scientists from Illinois
American physicists
Rare earth scientists
Fellows of the American Physical Society